Emma Frost is a British screenwriter and showrunner, known for her work in the television series Shameless, as well as several Phillipa Gregory adaptations.

Career
Frost began working on series such as The Queen's Nose, as well as  the BBC's popular continuing dramas: Doctors, and Casualty. Frost wrote and consulted on multiple episodes of Shameless. She has also written on The White Queen, Jamaica Inn,   The Man in the High Castle, and The White Princess. Recently, she was co-showrunner and wrote for The Spanish Princess with Matthew Graham.

Her film work includes the BBC Four drama Consuming Passion and the screenplay to Zelda, a film in development by Ron Howard.

Personal life
Frost is a trustee of the children's arts charity Anno's Africa. She is based in Falmouth, Cornwall.

References

External links
 

Living people
Year of birth missing (living people)
People from Falmouth, Cornwall
Showrunners
British women screenwriters
British women television writers
British television writers
British women television producers